Glycyrrhiza squamulosa, is a plant species in the family Fabaceae, native to China.

References 

squamulosa
Flora of Asia